Scrobipalpa suaedivorella is a moth in the family Gelechiidae. It was described by Pierre Chrétien in 1915. It is found in Tunisia, Algeria, Spain, south-western Russia, Turkey and Iran.

The forewings are ochreous whitish, lightly tinged with red. The hindwings are white.

The larvae feed on Suaeda species, including Suaeda drepanophylla, Suaeda microphylla and Suaeda physophora. They spin twigs together and mine the leaves.

References

Scrobipalpa
Moths described in 1915